Harold Lane David (May 25, 1921 – September 1, 2012) was an American lyricist. He grew up in New York City. He was best known for his collaborations with composer Burt Bacharach and his association with Dionne Warwick.

Early life
David was born in New York City, a son of Austrian Jewish immigrants Lina (née Goldberg) and Gedalier David, who owned a delicatessen in New York. He is the younger brother of American lyricist and songwriter Mack David. David attended Thomas Jefferson High School in Brooklyn and studied Journalism at New York University.

Career
David is credited with popular music lyrics, beginning in the 1940s with material written for bandleader Sammy Kaye and for Guy Lombardo. He worked with Morty Nevins of The Three Suns on four songs for the feature film Two Gals and a Guy (1951), starring Janis Paige and Robert Alda.

In 1957, David met composer Burt Bacharach at Famous Music in the Brill Building in New York. The two teamed up and wrote their first hit "The Story of My Life", recorded by Marty Robbins in 1957. Subsequently, in the 1960s and early 1970s Bacharach and David wrote some of the most enduring songs in American popular music, many for Dionne Warwick and also for The Carpenters, Dusty Springfield, B. J. Thomas, Gene Pitney, Tom Jones, Jackie DeShannon and others.

In the UK, a version of "The Story of My Life" recorded by Michael Holliday reached No. 1 in 1958 before being replaced by Perry Como's "Magic Moments", the first time any songwriter had consecutive #1 hits in the UK Singles Chart.

Bacharach and David hits included "Alfie", "Raindrops Keep Fallin' on My Head", "This Guy's in Love with You", "I'll Never Fall in Love Again", "Do You Know the Way to San Jose", "Walk On By", "What the World Needs Now Is Love", "I Say a Little Prayer", "(There's) Always Something There to Remind Me", "One Less Bell to Answer" and "Anyone Who Had a Heart".

The duo's film work includes the Oscar-nominated title songs for "What's New Pussycat?" and "Alfie", "The Look of Love", from Casino Royale; and the Oscar-winning "Raindrops Keep Fallin' on My Head" from Butch Cassidy and the Sundance Kid. In addition, the songs "Don't Make Me Over", "(They Long to Be) Close to You" and "Walk On By" have been inducted into the Grammy Hall of Fame.

David's work with other composers includes Albert Hammond for Willie Nelson and Julio Iglesias's "To All the Girls I've Loved Before"; Sarah Vaughan's "Broken Hearted Melody", with Sherman Edwards; the 1962 Joanie Sommers hit "Johnny Get Angry" also with Edwards; and "99 Miles From L.A." with Albert Hammond, recorded by Hammond and later Art Garfunkel. With Paul Hampton, David co-wrote the country standard "Sea of Heartbreak", a hit for Don Gibson and others, and, with Archie Jordan, the top 20, Ronnie Milsap hit, "It Was Almost Like a Song".

David contributed lyrics to three James Bond film themes—in addition to "The Look of Love" from Casino Royale (1967) with Bacharach, he wrote "We Have All the Time in the World", with John Barry and sung by Louis Armstrong for the 1969 film On Her Majesty's Secret Service, and in 1979, "Moonraker", also with Barry, sung by Bond regular Shirley Bassey for the film of the same name.

David and Bacharach were awarded the 2011 Gershwin Prize for Popular Song, bestowed by the Library of Congress, the first time a songwriting team was given the honor. David was recuperating from an illness and was unable to attend the Washington D.C. presentation ceremony in May 2012.

The television tribute, What the World Needs Now: Words by Hal David was aired on public television stations and released on home video in 2019. The program was hosted by Bette Midler and contained archival interviews with Hal David, and commentary, tributes, and archival performances with Burt Bacharach, Dionne Warwick, Valerie Simpson, Barbra Streisand, Cher, Dusty Springfield, B.J. Thomas, and Glen Campbell.

Personal life and death
David had two sons with his first wife Anne (died 1987). He married his second wife Eunice and had three grandchildren. David lived for many years in Roslyn, New York in the historic Mackay Estate Dairyman's Cottage of the Harbor Hill estate.

On September 1, 2012, David died from a stroke at Cedars-Sinai Medical Center in Los Angeles, at the age of 91. 

He is interred in the Forest Lawn Memorial Park beside his first wife, Anne, who died in 1987.

Awards and nominations

Academy Awards

Academy of Country Music Awards

Country Music Association Awards

Golden Globe Awards

Grammy Awards

Tony Awards

Honors
 1972: inducted into the Songwriters Hall of Fame
 1984: elected to the Nashville Songwriters Hall of Fame
 1991: received a Doctor of Music degree from Lincoln College, Illinois, for his major contribution to American music
 1997: Grammy Trustees Award (with Burt Bacharach)
 2000: received an honorary doctorate of humane letters degree from Claremont Graduate University
 2009: Golden Plate Award of the American Academy of Achievement
 2011: The Songwriters Hall of Fame presented him their newest award, the Visionary Leadership Award, for his decades of service
 2011: received a star on the Hollywood Walk of Fame
 2012: Gershwin prize recipient

Achievements
 Founder of the Los Angeles Music Center
 Member of the board of governors of Cedars-Sinai Medical Center
 Member of the board of directors of ASCAP, having served as its president, and later worked on reform of intellectual property rights
 Served on the advisory board of the Society of Singers
 Member of the board of visitors of Claremont Graduate University in California
 Chairman of the board of the National Academy of Popular Music and its Songwriters Hall of Fame

Work on Broadway
Promises, Promises (1968) – musical – lyricist 
André DeShields' Haarlem Nocturne (1984) – revue – featured songwriter
The Look of Love (2003) – revue – lyricist

See also
List of songwriter tandems
List of songs written by Burt Bacharach

References

External links

 
 
 Official Hal David website

1921 births
2012 deaths
20th-century American Jews
21st-century American Jews
APRA Award winners
ASCAP composers and authors
American lyricists
American musical theatre lyricists
American people of Austrian-Jewish descent
Best Original Song Academy Award-winning songwriters
Broadway composers and lyricists
Burials at Forest Lawn Memorial Park (Hollywood Hills)
Burt Bacharach
Gershwin Prize recipients
Grammy Award winners
Jewish American musicians
Jewish American songwriters
Musicians from New York City
Songwriters from New York (state)